Strassen is a municipality in the district of Lienz in the Austrian state of Tyrol.

Geography
Strassen has scattered settlements that lie either on the valley floor or on the sunny side of the valley.

References

External links

Cities and towns in Lienz District